Shenhua CTL (also known as Ningxia CTL) is a planned coal liquefaction plant in Ningdong, Ningxia, China. The liquefaction plant is to use a Sasol's indirect liquefaction technology, based on the Fischer–Tropsch process.

The feasibility study was carried out by Foster Wheeler and Wuhuan Engineering.  The constriction is to start in October 2010 and it expected to cost US$7 billion.  The project was developed by Sasol and Ningxia Coal Industry Group, a subsidiary of Shenhua Group.  The agreement between companies was signed on 21 June 2006.  In September 2011, Sasol pulled back from the project.

See also

 Erdos CTL

References

Coal infrastructure
Petroleum production
Energy infrastructure in China
Synthetic fuel facilities
Coal in China
Proposed energy infrastructure in China